Music is a 2008 drama film directed by Juraj Nvota, written by Ondrej Šulaj and starring Ľuboš Kostelný, Tatiana Pauhofová, Dorota Nvotová and Jan Budař. At the 2008 ceremony for the Sun in a Net Awards, the film won in nine categories, including Best Film.

Cast 
Ľuboš Kostelný as Martin
Tatiana Pauhofová as Maria
Dorota Nvotová as Anca Prepichová
Jan Budař as Hruskovic
Marek Geišberg as Zofré
Marián Geišberg as Father-in-law
Jana Oľhová as Mother-in-law
Petra Polnišová as Milada

 as Janota
Martin Trnavský as Foreman
Lujza Garajová Schrameková as Secretary
Kamil Mikulčík as Elektrician
 as Prokopec
Peter Pišťanek as Politruk
Ronnie Šandorová Traubnerová as Committee member
Ján Lehotský as Door-keeper
Lukáš Latinák as Japonec
Milan Ondrík as Fcela
Marian Marko as Kamil

References

External links 

2008 drama films
2008 films
Sun in a Net Awards winners (films)
German drama films
Slovak drama films
2000s German films